Vrbno pod Pradědem is a town in Bruntál District in the Moravian-Silesian Region of the Czech Republic. It has about 4,800 inhabitants.

Administrative parts
Villages and hamlets of Bílý Potok, Mnichov, Vidly and Železná are administrative parts of Vrbno pod Pradědem.

Geography
Vrbno pod Pradědem is located mostly in the Hrubý Jeseník mountain range. The slopes of Praděd, which is the highest mountain of the mountain range as is contained in the name of the town, are situated in the southwestern tip of the municipal territory. The Opava River and its tributary Střední Opava flow through the territory.

History

The first settlement, which later became Vrbno pod Pradědem, was probably founded in the 13th century. The settlement grew thanks to gold and metal mining. It was part of the Bruntál estate. From 1473 or 1474, the estate was owned by the lords of Vrbno (today Wierzbna), after whom the settlement was named. In 1611, the settlement was promoted to a free mining town for its important location. Hynek of Vrbno had built the town square and houses for miners.

After the Bohemian Revolt, the estate was confiscated from the lords of Vrbno and sold to the Teutonic Order. The Teutonic Knights owned Vrbno until 1938. During the Thirty Years' War in 1641, the town became the site of a military camp of the army of Lennart Torstensson. In the second half of the 17th century, the town was hit by the infamous Northern Moravia witch trials.

Along with the Kingdom of Bohemia, from 1804 it was ruled by the Austrian Empire, and after the compromise of 1867 it was part of the Austrian portion of Austria-Hungary, administratively located in the Freudenthal (Bruntál District), one of the 8 Bezirkshauptmannschaften in Austrian Silesia.

According to the census of 1910 the town had 3,614 inhabitants, all of them were German-speaking. Most populous religious groups were Roman Catholics with 3,293 (91.1%), followed by Protestants with 307 (8.5%). Following World War I, since 1918, it was part of newly independent Czechoslovakia.

From 1938, it was occupied by Germany and made one of the municipalities in Sudetenland. During World War II, the Germans operated the E791 forced labour subcamp of the Stalag VIII-B/344 prisoner-of-war camp in the town. The German-speaking population was expelled in 1945 in accordance to the Potsdam Agreement and Beneš decrees, and replaced by Czech settlers.

Demographics

Economy
In Vrbno pod Pradědem, together with Prudnik, are headquarters of the Euroregion Praděd.

Sights

The landmark of the town square and the whole town is the Church of Saint Michael the Archangel. The first brick church was built here in 1635–1637, and after its capacity ceased to be sufficient, a new structure in the Empire style was built in 1837–1844.

Grohmann Chateau is a former aristocratic residence in the Baroque and Empire styles with a core from the 17th century, gradually expanded in 18th and 19th centuries. The chateau is located in a landscape park surrounded by a wall from the 19th century. Today it is privately owned.

Notable people
Johann Karl Nestler (1783–1842), Austrian scientist

Twin towns – sister cities

Vrbno pod Pradědem is twinned with:
 Głogówek, Poland

References

External links

 
Historical website 

Cities and towns in the Czech Republic
Populated places in Bruntál District